F. Grant Gilmore was a playwright, author, and producer in the United States.

He corresponded with Crisis magazine in 1929 about publishing one of his stories. W. E. B. Du Bois wrote back that the publication could not "handle" the story. He worked at the Rochester Sentinel, was a barber, and was involved in an African American social club in Rochester, New York. He and his work are discussed in Jennifer James' 2007 study of African American war literature A Freedom Bought with Blood.

The Library of Congress has images from his novel The Problem about an African American Sergeant serving in the Spanish–American War including a photo of Gilmore in the book.

Writings
 Masonic and other Poems (1908)
 The Problem, a Military Novel'' (1915)

References

African-American journalists
African-American dramatists and playwrights
Year of birth missing (living people)
Year of death missing
Place of death missing
Writers from Rochester, New York
20th-century American dramatists and playwrights
American male dramatists and playwrights
War writers
Living people